Qarah Chopoq (also Romanized as Qareh Chopoq) is a village in Benajuy-ye Gharbi Rural District of the Central District of Bonab County, East Azerbaijan province, Iran. At the 2006 census, its population was 5,915 in 1,528 households. The following census in 2011 counted 5,718 people in 1,730 households. The latest census in 2016 showed a population of 5,456 people in 1,761 households; it was the largest village in its rural district.

References 

Bonab County

Populated places in East Azerbaijan Province

Populated places in Bonab County